The 2006 NESTEA European Championship Final (or the 2006 European Beach Volleyball Championships,) was held from August 25 to August 28, 2006 in The Hague, Netherlands. It was the fourteenth official edition of the men's event, which started in 1993, while the women competed for the thirteenth time.

The Championships were part of the 2006 Nestea European Championship Tour.

Men's competition
 A total number of 24 participating couples

Women's competition
 A total number of 24 participating couples

References
 Beach Volleyball Results
 

2006
E
B
B
21st century in The Hague
Beach volleyball in the Netherlands